Virgil Franklin Partch (October 17, 1916 – August 10, 1984), who generally signed his work Vip, was an American gag cartoonist. His work appeared in magazines of the 1940s and 1950s, and he created the newspaper comic strips Big George and The Captain's Gig.  He published 19 books of illustrations and drew art for children's books.

Despite being a gagwriter for The New Yorker, his own cartoons were rarely published there because, according to comics historian Bhob Stewart, "New Yorker editor Harold Ross disliked VIP's drawing style."

Early life and career
Born  in Alaska, from a mother with the maiden name Pavlof, Partch  studied at the University of Arizona and the Chouinard Art Institute in Los Angeles. He later  worked for the Disney studios, where he was among those fired after taking part in the Disney animators' strike of 1941. Soon, he began selling gag cartoons to large-circulation magazines, including Collier's, The New Yorker, Playboy, and True. After he left Disney, he worked briefly for Walter Lantz on Woody Woodpecker cartoons.

Partch was drafted into the US Army in 1944, and by the end of his two-year stint had been transferred from the infantry to become art director and cartoonist of the Army's weekly newspaper, the Fort Ord Panorama.

Out of the Army, Partch freelanced for ERA Productions. He published a number of books of single-panel cartoons, some previously published, others done specifically for the books. His 1950 bestseller, Bottle Fatigue, focused on alcohol-themed humor, sold nearly 95,000 hardcover copies by the decade's end.

Syndicated cartoonist

Later in his career, Partch drew the successful syndicated comic strip Big George and created the strip, The Captain's Gig (about a motley bunch of mariners and castaways), syndicated by Field Enterprises. He also illustrated several children's books including The Dog Who Snored Symphonies and The Christmas Cookie Sprinkle Snatcher.

From 1956, Partch lived in a house on the cliffs above Corona del Mar, Newport Beach. He often joined the cartoonists who regularly met at midday in the bar at the White House restaurant on the Pacific Coast Highway in Laguna Beach: Phil and Frank Interlandi, Ed Nofziger, John Dempsey, Don Tobin, Roger Armstrong, Dick Shaw, and Dick Oldden. The gathering began after Phil Interlandi moved to Laguna Beach in 1952. "That was the first bar I walked into in Laguna," Interlandi explained in 1982, "and it became a habit."

Later life and death
In 1979, Partch was awarded the Inkpot Award. With the onset of cataracts, Partch retired from cartooning in January 1984, and donated his collection of 3,700 original cartoons to the University of California, Irvine library. Partch and his wife died in an auto accident August 10, 1984, on Interstate 5 near Valencia, California. 

His cousin was the composer Harry Partch.

References

Further reading
Moore, Scott. "Life Inside a Comic Strip," Los Angeles Times (December 26, 1974), p. E1
Obituary, Los Angeles Times, (August 12, 1984), Metro Section, p. B1.

External links

Illustrated biography/bibliography
Virgil Partch photo gallery
Animation Archive

1916 births
1984 deaths
American comic strip cartoonists
Road incident deaths in California
Chouinard Art Institute alumni
University of Arizona alumni
Walt Disney Animation Studios people
Walter Lantz Productions people
Playboy cartoonists
Inkpot Award winners